Aeris may refer to:
 Aeris (airline), a defunct French airline
 Aerius of Sebaste, also known as Aëris

In fiction
 Aeris Gainsborough, character from Final Fantasy VII and other works in the Final Fantasy saga
 Aeris, a character in the webcomic VG Cats

In film
 Aeris (film), a film about a kitten with feline infectious peritonitis

See also
Aries (disambiguation)
Eris (disambiguation)